Grevillea hortiorum is a species of plant in the protea family and is endemic to the south-west of Western Australia. It is an erect, open shrub with divided leaves with linear lobes, and clusters of white flowers.

Description

Taxonomy
Grevillea hortiorum was first formally described in 2021 by Peter M. Olde in the journal Telopea from specimens collected by Fred Hort in the Gunapin State Forest near York in 1998. The specific epithet (hortiorum) honours amateur botanists and plant collectors Frederick and Jean Hort, who were instrumental in the discovery of this species.

Distribution and habitat
The species grows in open marri and wandoo woodland, sometimes in heath and thick scrub on granitic sandy, clay-loam with or over laterite. It occurs in scattered locations near York and Bindoon in the IBRA bioregions of Avon Wheatbelt and Jarrah Forest in south-west Western Australia.

References

hortiorum
Proteales of Australia
Endemic flora of Australia
Flora of Western Australia
Plants described in 2021